Wunjunga is a coastal locality in the Shire of Burdekin in Queensland, Australia.

Geography 
It is located south of Home Hill in North Queensland. The waters of the Coral Sea form the eastern boundary.

Road infrastructure
The Bruce Highway runs along the western boundary.

References 

Shire of Burdekin
Localities in Queensland